Begonia elaeagnifolia is a plant species in the family Begoniaceae, native to Africa from Cameroon to the Congo. Its small flowers are white-tipped pink.

Synonyms
 Begonia schultzei Engl. ex R.Wilczek
 Begonia wilczekiana N.Hallé
(source Plantlist)

References

elaeagnifolia
Taxa named by Joseph Dalton Hooker